Timothy Collins Wilson (August 5, 1961 – February 26, 2014) was an American comedian and country music artist, whose act combined stand-up comedy and original songs.

He released more than a dozen comedy albums, including several for Capitol Records Nashville, and made frequent appearances with Wilhite and Wall, John Boy and Billy, Big D and Bubba and Bob and Tom Show. Wilson also appeared on numerous television programs, including The Tonight Show with Jay Leno and American Revolution Country Comedy on CMT. In 2011, Wilson appeared on CMT's Ron White's Comedy Salute to the Troops.

In 2012, Wilson appeared on the Showtime comedy special Billy Gardell's: Road Dogs with Gardell hosting along with comedians Ben Creed and Kenny Rogerson.

Life and career
Wilson was born August 5, 1961, in Columbus, Georgia, and attended Presbyterian College in Clinton, South Carolina, as an English major. His parents were school teachers. He was a self-described libertarian, and sometimes included his political standpoints in his comedy routines. He co-wrote several parodies for the 1980s comedy duo Pinkard & Bowden, as well as comedian Jeff Foxworthy's 1996 single "Redneck 12 Days of Christmas." He wrote and recorded the novelty songs "Garth Brooks Has Ruined My Life" and "The Ballad of John Rocker."

Wilson began his recording career in Atlanta, on the Southern Tracks label with music publisher Bill Lowery. Members of the Atlanta Rhythm Section played on many of Wilson's early recordings, with ARS keyboardist Dean Daughtry producing. Wilson later recorded extensively in Muscle Shoals, Alabama, with the Muscle Shoals Rhythm Section. He co-produced Allnight Allstars with Muscle Shoals engineer Steve Melton. The project appeared on Capitol Nashville and includes Levon Helm, Gregg Allman, Jimmy Hall, Bobby Whitlock, and members of both the Atlanta Rhythm Section and the Muscle Shoals Rhythm Section.

In 2009, Wilson and Roger Keiss wrote a detective book entitled Happy New Year – ted, about serial killer Ted Bundy. He can be heard discussing his research and his book in great detail while visiting the Off The Air Podcast, hosted by Chick McGee of the Bob and Tom Show.

Wilson was posthumously inducted into the Georgia Music Hall of Fame in September 2015.

Death
Wilson died of a heart attack on February 26, 2014. Early reports stated that he died in Nashville, Tennessee; however, his longtime friend and manager Chris Dipetta clarified that he had been traveling, but had made it to his hometown of Columbus, Georgia, before he died. More details from the referenced story state: "Wilson, 52, drove to Columbus from a gig in Michigan to visit his brother en route to a weekend show in Birmingham, Ala. when he started feeling ill, said Dipetta, who worked with Wilson for 30 years. Dipetta continued, "I talked to him yesterday afternoon and he said he felt bad, was short of breath, and I said, "get to the hospital now!" Wilson's brother rushed him to a nearby hospital and Wilson suffered a massive heart attack and died at 9:15 p.m. Wilson left behind his wife, and two children.

Tribute show
On May 9, 2014, The Bob and Tom show sponsored a tribute comedy show to honor Wilson and help provide an education for his son. This three-and-a-half-hour show was presented at the Paramount Theatre (Anderson, Indiana). The announced lineup included the Bob and Tom show personalities (Bob Kevoian, Tom Griswold, Kristi Lee, and Chick McGee), as well as Dr. Gonzo, Heywood Banks, Drew Hastings, and Donny Baker. Surprise guests were introduced during the show and included, Duke Tumatoe, Indianapolis Colts punter Pat McAfee, Ricky Rydell and Scotty Bratcher. Additional music talent was provided by Steve Allee, keyboard and PJ Yinger, trumpet. Additionally, Bob Kevoian did an emotional solo performance of a Tim Wilson tribute song on ukulele. Wilson's last appearance on The Bob and Tom Show was on December 10, 2013.

Discography

Albums

Compilation albums

Singles

References

External links
 
 
 Tim Wilson at MySpace
 CMT profile

1961 births
2014 deaths
20th-century American singers
21st-century American singers
American comedy musicians
American country singer-songwriters
American libertarians
American male comedians
American male singer-songwriters
American stand-up comedians
Capitol Records artists
Country musicians from Georgia (U.S. state)
Musicians from Columbus, Georgia
American parodists
Parody musicians
20th-century American comedians
21st-century American comedians
20th-century American male singers
21st-century American male singers
Singer-songwriters from Georgia (U.S. state)